Niki Hyun Yang (born in Seoul, South Korea as Hyun Jeong Yang; , June 8, 1985) is a South Korean animator, writer, storyboard artist, and voice actress. After graduating from Hongik University and then CalArts, she became one of the storyboard artists of Family Guy before moving to Frederator Studios. She is best known for voicing BMO and Lady Rainicorn on the Cartoon Network series Adventure Time.

Filmography

Pilots

Video games

Writer/Storyboard Artist

References

Further reading

External links
 Official blog
 
 Former official website (archive)
 

1985 births
Living people
California Institute of the Arts alumni
South Korean animators
South Korean emigrants to the United States
South Korean voice actresses
South Korean women animators
South Korean storyboard artists
South Korean voice directors
South Korean women artists
South Korean television writers
Women television writers
South Korean screenwriters
Cartoon Network Studios people